Crosby and Hill Building is a historic commercial building located at Wilmington, New Castle County, Delaware. It was built about 1859, with the present facade added in 1920.  It is a four-story, three-bay rectangular plan building of bearing wall brick construction.  It has a flat roof with parapet wall. The building is an example of a late-19th century commercial building that was "modernized" in the first quarter of the 20th century.  The building has housed a number of businesses including a pharmacy, the Household of Faith Church, the Crosby and
Hill dry goods wholesaler and retailer, the Diamond Silk Shirt and Waist Company, the Wilmington Board of Trade Builders Exchange, and John's Bargain Basement Department Store Company.

It was added to the National Register of Historic Places in 1985.

References

Commercial buildings on the National Register of Historic Places in Delaware
Commercial buildings completed in 1859
Buildings and structures in Wilmington, Delaware
National Register of Historic Places in Wilmington, Delaware